Wabanquot may refer to:

People
Wabanquot (Chippewa chief) (ca. 1830-1898), a Chippewa chief

Ships
USS Wabanquot (YTB-525), later YTM-525, a United States Navy tug in service from 1945 to 1947 and from 1948 to 1976